East Manggarai Regency is a regency in East Nusa Tenggara province of Indonesia. Established on 17 July 2007 (out of the eastern six districts of the Manggarai Regency), the regency has its seat (capital) in the town of Borong. The population at the 2010 Census was 252,754, and at the 2020 Census was 275,603; the official estimate as at mid 2021 was 277,910.

Administrative Districts 
The East Manggarai Regency as at 2010 was divided into six districts (kecamatan), but since 2010 three additional districts (Elar Selatan, Poco Ranaka Timur and Rana Mese) have been created by splitting of existing districts. The districts are tabulated below with their areas and their populations at the 2010 Census and the 2020 Census. The table also includes the administrative centres and the number of administrative villages (a total of 159 rural desa and 17 urban kelurahan) in each district, and its postal codes.

Notes: (a) the 2010 population of the new Rana Mese District is included with the figure for Borong District. (b) the 2010 population of the new Elar Selatan District is included with the figure for Elar District. (c) the 2010 population of the new Poco Ranaka Timur District is included with the figure for Poco Ranaka District.

Tourism

The local government is aiming to promote a range of tourist sites including the following:

Nanga Labang village, on the seashore with pristine beaches
Lake Air Panas (Hot Water) in Rana Masak
Gampang Mas village near Borong
Laka Rana Tojong where the Victoria amazonica giant lily grows.

An additional feature of interest in the regency is the Pota Komodo dragon which has similar traits to the more well-known Komodo dragon found in neighbouring West Manggarai Regency.  The population of the Pota Komodo dragon has been declining and there is now concern about conservation of the local dragon population.

International visitors travel through various parts of the district, sometimes liaising with local groups such as village Catholic communities.  In late 2012, one visiting Polish couple took the decision to be married in Lait Valley in the Kota Komba area,

References 

Regencies of East Nusa Tenggara
Flores Island (Indonesia)